Ismail Salami Yakubu, (born 8 April 1985) is a Nigerian professional footballer who plays as a defender for Southern Football League side Merthyr Town. He has been capped for the England semi-professional team.

Club career

Barnet
Yakubu was born in Kano, Kano State, and raised in England. He joined Barnet at the age of 11, turned professional at 16, and made his first-team debut at the age of 17 while still studying for his A-levels – a 3–2 defeat against rivals Stevenage, with Yakubu coming on as a 67th-minute substitute. He started the following match in a 1–1 draw with Boston United. He became a regular in the first-team squad, and was team captain from August 2007 to November 2008. In June 2009 he signed a new two-year contract with the club. He was released in May 2010 after making a total of 297 appearances for the club.

AFC Wimbledon
In July 2010, Yakubu signed for Conference Premier side AFC Wimbledon. On 14 August 2010, Yakubu made his AFC Wimbledon debut in a 1–0 victory over Southport, featuring for the full 90 minutes. On 11 September 2010, Yakubu scored his first goal for the club, doubling AFC Wimbledon's lead in their 4–0 victory over Bath City. He played in the 2011 Conference Premier play-off Final, coming off the bench and scoring a penalty in the penalty shoot-out.

After appearing in twenty-seven league games, Yakubu was released at the end of the season.

Newport County
On 24 May 2011, he was released by AFC Wimbledon and on 22 June joined Newport County. On 13 August 2011, Yakubu made his Newport County debut in their 3–2 defeat against Kettering Town, featuring for the entire 90 minutes.

On 26 September 2011, Yakubu joined fellow Conference Premier side Cambridge United on a one-month emergency loan deal. However, Yakubu returned to Newport without making a single appearance at Cambridge.

On 12 May 2012, Yakubu played for Newport County in the FA Trophy Final at Wembley Stadium which Newport lost 2–0 to York City. In the 2012–13 season he was part of the Newport team that finished 3rd in the league, reaching the Conference Premier play-offs. Newport County won the playoff final versus Wrexham at Wembley Stadium 2–0 to return to the Football League after a 25-year absence with promotion to Football League Two.

On 12 May 2015, it was announced that Yakubu would leave the club upon the expiry of his contract on 30 June.

Woking
Shortly after his release from Newport, Yakubu went on to sign a one-year contract with Woking for the 2015–2016 season.

Unfortunately his season only lasted six games after rupturing his anterior cruciate knee ligaments in a game against Boreham Wood On 18 May 2016, Yakubu signed a new one-year deal with Woking. Preceding the departure of Mark Ricketts, Yakubu was named captain for the 2016–17 campaign. Yakubu scored his first goal of the season, in Woking's 3–1 home defeat against Lincoln City, netting the Cards' equaliser just after the half-time break. On 23 May 2017, it was announced that Yakubu would leave Woking upon the expiry of his current deal in June 2017.

Hemel Hempstead Town
On 12 June 2017, it was announced that Yakubu would join National League South side Hemel Hempstead Town preceding his release from Woking.

Kingstonian
Yakubu signed for Kingstonian on 22 February 2019.

Hayes & Yeading United
Yakubu lined up for Hayes & Yeading United on the opening day of the 2019–20 season. In November 2019, he joined Merthyr Town on loan until the New Year. The loan was then extended until the end of the season. Yakubu became a fans favourite at The Martyrs after his impressive performances towards the end of the 2019/20 season.

Merthyr Town
Merthyr Town completed the signing of Yakubu ahead of the 2020/21 season, after his six-month loan from Hayes & Yeading United. He left the club when they suspended their participation from the Southern League before the start of the season.

Penybont
Yakubu signed for Cymru Premier side Penybont after his departure from Merthyr.

Return to Merthyr
Yakubu re-joined Merthyr for the 2021-22 season.

Career statistics

Honours
Barnet
Conference National: 2004–05

AFC Wimbledon
Conference Premier play-offs: 2010–11

Newport County
FA Trophy runners-up 2011–12
Conference Premier play-offs: 2012–13

References

External links

 (2002–2004)
 (2004–)

1985 births
Living people
Sportspeople from Kano
Nigerian footballers
English footballers
England semi-pro international footballers
Black British sportspeople
Association football defenders
Barnet F.C. players
AFC Wimbledon players
Newport County A.F.C. players
Woking F.C. players
Hemel Hempstead Town F.C. players
Kingstonian F.C. players
Hayes & Yeading United F.C. players
Merthyr Town F.C. players
Penybont F.C. players
English Football League players
National League (English football) players
Isthmian League players
Southern Football League players
Cymru Premier players
Nigerian emigrants to the United Kingdom
English people of Nigerian descent